George Peter Burt (11 November 1886 — 20 January 1935) was a Scottish first-class cricketer and businessman.

The son of Peter Burt, he was born in November 1886 at Dennistoun, Lanarkshire. Burt was a club cricketer for Uddingston Cricket Club, whom he captained for several years. He made two appearances in first-class cricket for Scotland against Ireland at Dundee in 1924, and Lancashire at Old Trafford during Scotland's 1925 tour of England. Described as a stylish batsman and one of the best Scotland had produced, he scored 35 runs in his two first-class matches, with a highest score of 26. 

Outside of cricket, Burt was the director of the Acme Wringers company based in Bridgeton, Glasgow. He died at a nursing home in the Aberdeen suburb of Bieldside in January 1935, following a short illness; he was predeceased by his wife.

References

External links

1886 births
1935 deaths
People from Dennistoun
Cricketers from Glasgow
Scottish cricketers
20th-century Scottish businesspeople